Hon. Lionel Damer (16 September 1748 – 28 May 1807) was a British Whig politician.

Family
Lionel Damer was the third son of Joseph Damer, 1st Earl of Dorchester by Lady Caroline Sackville (daughter of Lionel Cranfield Sackville, 1st Duke of Dorset and Elizabeth Colyear, his wife, daughter of Lieutenant-General Walter Philip Colyear (brother to David Colyear, 1st Earl of Portmore). Lionel's brothers were the Hon. John Damer and the Rt. Hon. George Damer, 2nd Earl of Dorchester.

Lionel Damer was educated at Eton (1755–65) and Trinity College, Cambridge (1766).
He married Williamsa or Williamsea Janssen (daughter of William Janssen Esq, fourth son of Sir Theodore Janssen, 1st Baronet of Owre Moyne). They lived at Came House in Winterborne Came and there is a memorial to them in St Peter's Church nearby.

Political career
Lionel was appointed Sheriff of Dorset for the year 1785.
He was the Member of Parliament for Peterborough 28 February 1786 – 21 February 1802. He took over the seat following the death of James Farrel Phipps. He held the seat until ill health forced him to retire shortly before the General Election in 1802.

References

1748 births
People educated at Eton College
Whig (British political party) MPs for English constituencies
British MPs 1784–1790
British MPs 1790–1796
British MPs 1796–1800
1807 deaths
Alumni of Trinity College, Cambridge
Members of the Parliament of Great Britain for English constituencies
Members of the Parliament of the United Kingdom for English constituencies
UK MPs 1801–1802
Dawson-Damer family